Adam Roberge (born 27 March 1997) is a Canadian cyclist, who currently rides for Jukebox Cycling, a multi-discipline team of six riders.

Major results
2015
 1st  Road race, National Junior Road Championships
2016
 3rd Time trial, National Under-23 Road Championships
2017
 1st  Time trial, National Under-23 Road Championships
 1st  Time trial, Canada Summer Games
2018
 1st  Time trial, National Under-23 Road Championships
 4th Time trial, National Road Championships
2019
 1st  Time trial, National Under-23 Road Championships
 3rd Time trial, National Road Championships
 3rd Overall Tucson Bicycle Classic
 4th Chrono Kristin Armstrong
 6th Overall Grand Prix Cycliste de Saguenay
2021
 4th Time trial, National Road Championships
 4th Overall Joe Martin Stage Race

References

External links

1997 births
Living people
Canadian male cyclists
Cyclists from Montreal